Raúl Arturo Chávez Sarmiento (born 24 October 1997) is a Peruvian child prodigy in mathematics.

He won a silver medal at the 2010 IMO at age 12 years, 263 days, a gold medal (6th ranked overall) at the 2011 IMO, and again a silver medal at the 2012 IMO.

Chávez Sarmiento is currently a graduate student in mathematics at Harvard University.

See also
List of child prodigies
List of International Mathematical Olympiad participants

References

External links

1997 births
Living people
International Mathematical Olympiad participants
Peruvian mathematicians
21st-century mathematicians